George Hayley (1722-1781) was a British merchant, shipowner, whaler and politician who sat in the House of Commons  from 1774 to 1781.

Life and career
Hayley was the eldest son of George Hayley and his wife Hannah Hopkins. His initial career was that of cordwainer. By 1767 he was an agent importing whale oil from America. He owned three or four South Sea whaling vessels between 1775 and 1781.

He married Mary Storke, who was sister of John Wilkes and widow of Samuel Storke Jr., a merchant of London.  
 
Hayley was elected  Member of Parliament for City of London at the  1774 general election. He also became an alderman in 1774  and was a  sheriff of London in 1775–6. He was also President of Lloyd’s of London. He was returned as MP for the City at the 1780 general election. He was a poor speaker and his main concern was on behalf of merchants trading with America.

Hayley died on 30 August 1781.

Notes

References

Further reading

1722 births
Date of birth unknown
1781 deaths
Sheriffs of the City of London
Members of the Parliament of Great Britain for English constituencies
British MPs 1774–1780
British MPs 1780–1784
British people in whaling